Salem Ahamed is an Indian film director, screen writer and producer. After working for a long time as a travel consultant, he joined as a creative director and script writer in a television channel. His directorial debut, Adaminte Makan Abu (2011), fetched him numerous accolades and was screened at various international film festivals. It was also chosen as India's official entry to be considered for nomination in the Best Foreign Film category for the 84th Academy Awards. Then he made two movies Kunjananthante Kada (2013) and Pathemari (2015) with Mammootty as the lead. The later won the Best Feature Film In Malayalam award at the 63rd National Film Awards. Salim's latest film is And the Oscar Goes To...(2019), which tells about his own experiences with production and marketing of his first film.

Biography

Early life and family
Salim Ahamed was born on 6 July 1971 in Mattannur, Kerala, as the son of Ahamed Kutty and Asya Umma. He graduated in Commerce from Mattannur Pazhassiraja NSS College, and obtained a professional diploma in Travel and Tourism. Upon graduating from college, Salim dreamed of joining the film industry but found it hard to break into and ended up a travel consultant. For his passion, he joined the School of Drama in Thrissur, Kerala. He worked as a Creative Director and Script Writer with Surya TV and then worked in films such as Saphalyam as an Assistant Director. His notable works as a television director include Rasikaraja No.1, a comedy programme telecast in Surya TV.

Salim is married to Mafeedha. They have three sons, Allen Zahar Ahamed, Amal Zahar Ahamed And Adam Zahar Ahamed. Salim Ahmed is now settled at Palottupalli, Mattanur.

Adaminte Makan Abu

He made his feature film debut with Adaminte Makan Abu, a story he had entertained in his mind for many years. It was the stories he heard and the people he met during his days as a travel agent that sowed the seeds for Adaminte Makan Abu. The film portrayed the story of a poor attar (a kind of perfume) seller Abu whose only remaining wish in life is the Hajj pilgrimage, which he strives hard to fulfill, and at the verge of the fulfilment, he opts out when he fears that the means is not fully legitimate. Salim himself co-produced the film, and had to spend every rupee raised from what he had saved up over the years working on scripts for television serials and assisting directors to complete the film. The film opened to critical acclaim and fetched numerous honours including four National Film Awards and four Kerala State Film Awards.

The film was screened at various international film festivals: 55th BFI London Film Festival, MAMI Mumbai Film Festival, 8th South Asian International Film Festival (SAIFF), 42nd International Film Festival of India, 5th Indo-German Film Festival, 17th Kolkata Film Festival, 16th International Film Festival of Kerala (IFFK), and 23rd Palm Springs International Film Festival (PSIFF), and 8th Dubai International Film Festival.

Other projects
Salim had written three basic plots during his college days. One was based in a local school in Kerala, one was a thriller, and the third was the story of Abu. He decided to film Adaminte Makan Abu as a number of people liked the story line; he wanted his first film to have a message and to be impressive. It was reported that he had started the pre-production works of the one based in the local school, as well as was planning to bring the story of Travancore king Marthanda Varma on big screen. However, none of the projects materialised.

Salim officially announced his next project in September 2012. The project was titled Kunjananthante Kada and starred Mammootty in the lead role. The film started production in February 2013 and released in theatres in August 2013. Salim then directed the critically acclaimed Pathemari which follows the life of a Gulf migrant from Kerala who migrated when the Kerala Gulf boom was just beginning. The film won several awards including the National Film Award for Best Feature Film in Malayalam.

Filmography

Awards
 National Film Awards
 Best Feature Film – Adaminte Makan Abu
 Best Feature Film In Malayalam- Pathemari (2015) 

 Kerala State Film Awards
 Best Film – Adaminte Makan Abu
 Best Screenplay – Adaminte Makan Abu

 Academy Awards
 Longlisted for Best Foreign Film nomination – Adaminte Makan Abu

 Asiavision Awards
 Best Outstanding Indian Film  – Adaminte Makan Abu
 Best Debut Director  – Adaminte Makan Abu
 2013 – Asiavision Awards – Socially Committed Movie – Kunjananthante Kada

 Filmfare Awards South
 2016 - Filmfare Award for Best Film – Malayalam for Pathemari

 Kazan International Festival of Muslim Cinema (Golden Minbar International Film Festival)
 The Best Feature Film Scenario – Adaminte Makan Abu
 The Prize of the Guild of Film Critics and Film scholars of Russia – Adaminte Makan Abu

 International Film Festival of India
 Special Jury Award for Best Film (Silver Peacock) – Adaminte Makan Abu

 International Film Festival of Kerala
 NETPAC Award for Best Malayalam Film – Adaminte Makan Abu
 FIPRESCI Award for Best Malayalam Film – Adaminte Makan Abu
 Hassankutty Award for Best Indian Debut Director – Adaminte Makan Abu

 Thikkurissy Foundation Awards (2012)
 Best Film – Adaminte Makan Abu
 Best Director – Adaminte Makan Abu

 Others
 Special Award at the Vellinakshatram Film Awards – Adaminte Makan Abu
 Shihab Thangal Cultural Award

References

External links
 

995 births
Artists from Kannur
21st-century Indian Muslims
Malayalam film directors
Malayalam screenwriters
Kerala State Film Award winners
Living people
Film directors from Kerala
Writers from Kannur
21st-century Indian film directors
Screenwriters from Kerala
Film producers from Kerala
Malayalam film producers
21st-century Indian dramatists and playwrights
Producers who won the Best Feature Film National Film Award
Directors who won the Best Feature Film National Film Award
21st-century Indian screenwriters